Patrick Kidd, who attended Colchester Royal Grammar School, is a journalist and blogger specialising in sport generally, and cricket and rowing in particular.  He is currently the diary editor, and was previously a sports writer, for The Times, where he has been working since 2001, and whose website hosts his Line and Length, "A very English cricket blog".  He also appears frequently in Wisden Cricketers' Almanack and The Wisden Cricketer, and is a regular radio and television pundit.  His first book, Best of Enemies: Whingeing Poms Versus Arrogant Aussies, was released in early 2009. A second book, The Worst of Rugby, was published later that year.

He also writes a light-hearted personal blog, The Questing Vole, about politics, history, culture and sport, in which he describes himself as "a 1920s eccentric trapped in the body of a 21st-century journalist. Not a very fetching body, either." The blog takes its name from the opening of Scoop, Evelyn Waugh's satire on journalism.

Published books
The Best of Enemies: Whingeing Poms Versus Arrogant Aussies, Know the Score Books, 2009
The Worst of Rugby: Violence and Foul Play in a Hooligans' Game Played by Gentlemen, Pitch Publishing Ltd., 2009
The Times Diary at 50: The Antidote to the News, Times Books, 2016

References

External links 
Line and Length.
The Questing Vole.

British bloggers
British male journalists
Cricket historians and writers
Rugby union commentators
Living people
Male bloggers
Year of birth missing (living people)